Lamble is a surname of British origin and may refer to:

Jo Lamble (born 1965), Australian clinical psychologist
Lloyd Lamble (1914–2008), Australian actor
Martin Lamble (1949–1969), British drummer
Regan Lamble (born 1991), Australian athlete

English-language surnames